Tatong is a town in north eastern Victoria, Australia.

The area is a mixture of farmland, pine plantations and dense bush

History
The Post Office opened on 10 October 1890 and closed in 1993.

In 1914, a railway from Benalla to Tatong was opened. Timber from the surrounding hills was harvested to supply the early Melbourne power station, but coal from the Latrobe Valley became the favoured fuel source. In February 1928, staff were withdrawn from Tatong railway station. Persistent operating losses on the operation of the line led its closure in July 1947.

Tatong is the birthplace of Michael Joseph Savage, the first Labour Prime Minister of New Zealand, and Graeme Peck, male lead for the Australian Ballet Company.

Facilities
It has a pub, the Tatong Tavern, a memorial hall and sports ground.

It has an active community with archery, cricket, tennis and table tennis clubs. Tatong used to have netball and Australian rules football teams competing in the Ovens and King Football League prior to being removed in 2014. Other groups include the Tatong Angling Group, Tatong Heritage Group  and the Tatong Young Bloods.

People from Tatong
 Michael Joseph Savage, former Prime Minister of New Zealand

References

External links

Geoscience Australia place names search: Tatong

Towns in Victoria (Australia)
Rural City of Benalla